WIOV (1240 AM) is a commercial radio station licensed to serve Reading, Pennsylvania. The station is licensed to Major Keystone, LLC, and broadcasts an urban contemporary radio format. Its programming is also carried on FM translator W253CK (98.5).

WIOV previously broadcast all home and away games of the Reading Fightin Phils, the Double-A affiliate of the Philadelphia Phillies, and the Reading Royals of the ECHL.

Cumulus Media sold the station to Major Keystone LLC on September 24, 2021. On January 17, 2022, following the sale's completion, WIOV changed its format from sports to urban contemporary, branded as "Loud 98.5"; the "Loud" programming, including the WQHT-based morning show Ebro in the Morning, had previously aired on W257CI (99.3 FM) and on the HD3 channel of WLEV.

Previous logo

References

External links

Urban contemporary radio stations in the United States
IOV
Radio stations established in 1946
1946 establishments in Pennsylvania